The men's Greco-Roman flyweight competition at the 1964 Summer Olympics in Tokyo took place from 16 to 19 October at the Komazawa Gymnasium. Nations were limited to one competitor.

Competition format

This Greco-Roman wrestling competition continued to use the "bad points" elimination system introduced at the 1928 Summer Olympics for Greco-Roman and at the 1932 Summer Olympics for freestyle wrestling, as adjusted at the 1960 Summer Olympics. Each bout awarded 4 points. If the victory was by fall, the winner received 0 and the loser 4. If the victory was by decision, the winner received 1 and the loser 3. If the bout was tied, each wrestler received 2 points. A wrestler who accumulated 6 or more points was eliminated. Rounds continued until there were 3 or fewer uneliminated wrestlers. If only 1 wrestler remained, he received the gold medal. If 2 wrestlers remained, point totals were ignored and they faced each other for gold and silver (if they had already wrestled each other, that result was used). If 3 wrestlers remained, point totals were ignored and a round-robin was held among those 3 to determine medals (with previous head-to-head results, if any, counting for this round-robin).

Results

Round 1

Singh withdrew after his bout.

 Bouts

 Points

Round 2

Six wrestlers were eliminated with their second loss each. Wilson had a bye to stay at 0 points, the only competitor to do so as Hanahara won by decision and received 1 point.

 Bouts

 Points

Round 3

Ganotis and Sayadov each had their second loss and were eliminated. Bozkurt had his first loss, but with a tie and win by decision earlier, had enough points to eliminate him as well. Sin won in round 3, but the point from the win by decision was enough to eliminate him. Hanahara and Pîrvulescu took the lead with 2 points after Wilson's loss put him at 3 (along with three other wrestlers). Lacour also survived a loss, at 5 points.

 Bouts

 Points

Round 4

Four of the seven wrestlers were eliminated in this round (all finishing with the same number of points and therefore tied for 4th place), with the three remaining advancing to the final round. Wilson, after a first round win and second round bye, had his second loss in a row. Fabra, Mewis, and Lacour all finished with 3–1 records, but 6 points because their wins had all been by decision.

 Bouts

 Points

Final round

None of the medalists had faced each other yet, so the final round was a full round-robin. Kerezov defeated Pîrvulescu, as did Hanahara. This gave Pîrvulescu the bronze medal and set up a de facto gold medal match between Kerezov and Hanahara. The latter wrestler prevailed by decision.

 Bouts

 Points

References

Wrestling at the 1964 Summer Olympics